This is about the 2001 game for Game Boy Advance.  For the series, see Fire Pro Wrestling.

Fire Pro Wrestling (released in Japan as ) is a professional wrestling video game in the Fire Pro Wrestling series and was the first Fire Pro game to receive an official English translation and the first to be released on a portable system rather than a console.  A direct sequel, Fire Pro Wrestling 2, was released in 2002. The games use the A and B buttons for striking and grappling. True to many Fire Pro games, MMA is featured in the game and federations like Pride and The Ultimate Fighting Championship feature with fighters. The Octagon also made an appearance in this game, but was removed in the second for copyright issues.

Gameplay

True to the series, Fire Pro Wrestling makes the player play with strategy. The games use the A and B buttons for striking and grappling. True to many Fire Pro games, MMA is featured in the game and federations like Pride and the Ultimate Fighting Championship feature with fighters. The Octagon also made an appearance in this game, but was removed in the second for copyright issues.

Reception

The game received "favorable" reviews according to the review aggregation website Metacritic. However, NextGen said of the game, "Those who have the steep learning curve will discover a fighting engine of uncanny depth. The problem is, only a determined few are likely to ever get this far." In Japan, Famitsu gave it a score of 27 out of 40.

References

External links

2001 video games
Fire Pro Wrestling
Game Boy Advance games
Game Boy Advance-only games
Human Entertainment games
Spike (company) games
Video games developed in Japan

fr:Fire Pro Wrestling (jeu vidéo)